The 2021 NHL Expansion Draft was an expansion draft that was conducted by the National Hockey League on July 21, 2021, to fill the roster of the league's expansion team for the 2021–22 season, the Seattle Kraken.

Background
On December 4, 2017, the Seattle City Council voted 7–1 to approve a memorandum of understanding between the city of Seattle and the Los Angeles–based Oak View Group, co-founded by Tim Leiweke, for renovations of KeyArena. On December 7, the NHL's board of governors agreed to consider an expansion application from Seattle, with an expansion fee set at US$650 million. The Seattle ownership group was represented by David Bonderman and Jerry Bruckheimer, who conducted a preliminary season ticket drive to gauge interest in Seattle.

On February 13, 2018, the Oak View Group filed an application with the NHL for an expansion team and paid a US$10 million application fee. At the time, the earliest the team could have begun playing was the 2020–21 season, pending the completion of arena renovations.

On October 2, 2018, the NHL Executive Committee unanimously agreed to recommend the expansion bid to a vote of the Board of Governors in December. The NHL Board of Governors voted unanimously to approve Seattle's expansion team on December 4, 2018.

Rules

Seattle followed the same rules for the draft as the Vegas Golden Knights in the 2017 NHL Expansion Draft, with the provision that Vegas was exempted from losing a player in exchange for forgoing a share of the Kraken's expansion fee. The 30 other teams submitted their lists of protected players on July 17. Teams could protect eight skaters and a goaltender, or seven forwards, three defensemen, and a goaltender; and they had to expose at least two forwards and one defenseman who were under contract for the 2021–22 season and played in at least 27 games in the 2020–21 season, or more than 54 games in the 2019–20 and 2020–21 seasons combined. Teams also had to expose a goaltender under contract for the 2021–22 season or who would be a restricted free agent (with a qualifying offer received) in 2021. Players who made their professional debuts in North America in the 2019–20 or 2020–21 seasons were not eligible to be picked, and such players were not needed be protected from expansion.

At least twenty of the thirty players selected by Seattle had to be under contract for the 2021–22 season, and the team was required to select a minimum of fourteen forwards, nine defensemen, and three goaltenders. Furthermore, the 2021–22 salaries of the thirty players selected (as measured in terms of what is counted against the salary cap, otherwise colloquially known as the "cap hit") had to add up to between 60% and 100% of the 2020–21 salary cap (i.e., the full nominal cap, not the prorated cap for the shortened 56-game season that was played). Seattle was granted a 48-hour window prior to the draft to sign any unprotected pending free agent (restricted or unrestricted, one per team). Teams that lost a player to Seattle during the signing window did not have a player selected from its roster during this draft as the signed player counted as Seattle's selection.

Teams were required to protect any contracted players with no move clauses (NMCs) with one of the team's slots for protected players, unless:
The contract expired on July 28, 2021, in which case the NMC was considered void for the draft.
The player with an NMC continuing past July 28, 2021, was deemed to have a career-threatening injury and is thus declared exempt from selection and use of a protection slot.
The player with an NMC waived his no-movement clause for the expansion draft.

Any player picked in the expansion draft cannot have his contract bought out until after the completion of the 2021–22 season.

Protected players 
The protected players' list was published on July 18, 2021.

Eastern Conference 
Italics: Players protected for contractual reasons.

Western Conference

Draft results 

All 30 draft picks were submitted at once; they were announced in alphabetical order of teams in each division from east to west.

Trades 
The Seattle Kraken made no trades for concessions in exchange for agreeing to select certain unprotected players.

Post-draft
Not all players selected by the Kraken in the Expansion Draft would remain with the team. Some players were traded in the following days:

 Tyler Pitlick was traded to Calgary for a fourth-round pick in 2022 on July 22.
 Kurtis MacDermid was traded to Colorado for a fourth-round pick in 2023 on July 27.
 Vitek Vanecek was traded back to Washington for Winnipeg's second-round pick in 2023 on July 28.

Other players who were no longer on the Kraken's roster at the start of the 2021–22 NHL season include the following:

Gavin Bayreuther re-signed as an unrestricted free agent with Columbus on July 28, 2021.
John Quenneville signed as an unrestricted free agent with ZSC Lions on September 5, 2021.

Guest appearances
Several Seattle sportspeople and celebrities made appearances to announce the draft picks, including Shawn Kemp and Gary Payton of the Seattle SuperSonics, as well as former Sonics coach Lenny Wilkens; Marshawn Lynch and Bobby Wagner of the Seattle Seahawks; Sue Bird of the Seattle Storm via video conference as she was in Tokyo for the 2020 Summer Olympics; Kyle Lewis of the Seattle Mariners; Brad Evans and Jordan Morris of the Seattle Sounders FC; Kraken scout Cammi Granato, and Seattle based rapper Macklemore. Western Washington Female Hockey members, Anchorage Hockey Association members, Kraken season-ticket holders, and construction workers from Climate Pledge Arena were also featured during the event. Co-owner Jerry Bruckheimer and general manager Ron Francis also participated.

See also 
2020–21 NHL transactions
2021–22 NHL transactions
2021 NHL Entry Draft	
2021–22 NHL season

References

National Hockey League expansion drafts
NHL Expansion Draft
NHL Expansion Draft
Ice hockey in Seattle
NHL Expansion Draft
Seattle Kraken
Expansion Draft